Laevitrigonia is a genus of fossil clams, marine bivalve mollusks in the family  Trigoniidae. This bivalve is sometimes preserved with mineralized soft-tissue.

References

Trigoniidae
Jurassic bivalves
Prehistoric molluscs of Europe
Prehistoric bivalves of North America
Prehistoric bivalve genera